is a Japanese manga artist.

Miyasaka is best known for the manga Kare First Love.

Her newest manga is called , which currently consists of 12 volumes.

Works
16 Engage 2 volumes
Love Love 1 volume - first volume in the "Kaporin no Yuuwaku Kissu" series
Akutou (Scoundrel) 1 volume - second volume in the "Kaporin no Yuuwaku Kissu" series
Kiss in the Blue 4 volumes
Binetsu Shōjo (Feverish Girl) 10 volumes
Miseinen Lovers went on hiatus after author's health deteriorated from cancer.
Kare First Love 10 volumes
Bokutachi wa Shitte Shimatta 2007, 14 volumes
"Barairo no yakusoku" 2013

References

External links
 Kaho Miyasaka's website  
 The Ultimate Manga Guide: Miyasaka Kaho 

Living people
Year of birth missing (living people)
Manga artists from Chiba Prefecture